Cognitive Development is a quarterly peer-reviewed scientific journal covering cognitive and developmental psychology. It was established in 1986 and is published by Elsevier. The editor-in-chief is Stuart Marcovitch (University of North Carolina at Greensboro). According to the Journal Citation Reports, the journal has a 2018 impact factor of 2.060.

References

External links

Cognitive development
Developmental psychology journals
Cognitive science journals
Elsevier academic journals
English-language journals
Publications established in 1986
Quarterly journals